The Van's RV-12 is an American two-seat, single-engine, low-wing homebuilt airplane eligible for the U.S. E-LSA category, sold in kit form and as a complete ready-to-fly aircraft by Van's Aircraft of Aurora, Oregon.

The RV-12 had its first flight on November 9, 2006. Deliveries of partial kits commenced in April 2008 and, as of November 2022, 767 aircraft have been completed and flown.

Design and development

The architect of the line of Van's aircraft, Richard VanGrunsven, designed the RV-12 with several specific goals in mind. These include:
 Flying qualities equal to or better than the standard set by the RV-9A
  aircraft empty weight
 Cabin width of 
 A low parts count, with an aim of reducing kit cost and construction time
 Minimal use of composites and maximum use of aluminum
 Maximum use of simple hand tools only for construction

The LSA class limits aircraft to a maximum takeoff weight of 1,320 lb (599 kg), a maximum clean, stall speed with no flaps of 51 mph (45 knots) and a maximum level speed of 138 mph (120 knots) and the production RV-12 falls within those maximum limits.

The prototype incorporated several new features for an RV-series aircraft including: removable wings, full-span flaperons and an all-moving stabilator. It is intended that the RV-12 will be powered by a Rotax 912ULS engine of 100 hp and equipped with a Sensenich composite ground-adjustable propeller, although as a kit aircraft the builder can complete it as they choose.

Originally, the RV-12 was equipped with the Dynon FlightDEK-D180, the Garmin GPS 496, Garmin SL-40, Garmin GTX-327 Transponder, and the Flightcom 403 intercom. The RV-12 avionics kit now comes with the choice of either the 10" Dynon SkyView D-1000 or the Garmin G3X Touch avionics packages.  Either package includes synthetic vision, Mode-S transponder, and mapping to replace the Garmin GPS Map 496, and a Garmin GTR 200 to replace the SL-40 transceiver and FliteCom intercom.

Van's aircraft has many optional packages for the RV-12. These options do not change the E-LSA licensing. A lighting package is available, two-axis autopilot, interior package (sidewall covers, carpet, different colors), and wheel fairings to protect the wheels and increase the speed a few knots.

The aircraft received S-LSA approval in July, 2009 making it possible for home builders to license it in either the E-LSA category, simplifying certification requirements, or the experimental, amateur-built category.

The RV-12 is the first production kit from Van's that is predominantly constructed using blind rivets, which allows the majority of the construction to be done without an assistant. The use of computerized punch machines to punch out most of the rivet holes to final size simplifies construction by minimizing the need to deburr or final size most of the rivet holes. Since the wings are designed to be detached, the majority of the airplane can be constructed in most standard residential garages.

The RV-12 is sold as six sub-kits: wings, fuselage, empennage & tailcone, finishing (cowling, wiring, canopy, etc.), powerplant, and avionics. Van's indicates that they cannot "provide assistance or advice on any deviations from the supplied parts and assembly instructions".

Partial RV-12 kits became available to customers in April 2008, with complete kits made available in the fall of 2008.

In November 2014 Van's Aircraft and Dynon announced that a two-screen glass cockpit option was available for the RV-12. This can be installed on new-build aircraft and also retro-fitted to aircraft already in service with a single screen.

A new variant, the RV-12iS, was introduced in 2017. The RV-12iS is an incremental improvement over the RV-12 which allows the installation of the Rotax 912ULS (carbureted) or the Rotax 912iS (fuel-injected) engines. It also incorporates a new cowling and throttle quadrant design, quick-retracting flaps, a quick-adjusting seat, redesigned landing gear attachments and fuel tank, among other improvements.

Production
In October 2012, Van's announced that the company would produce a limited run of twelve fully assembled RV-12s, sold as Special Light-sport Aircraft (SLSAs). The aircraft were assembled from production kits by Synergy Air, with the "Signature Edition" RV-12s costing US$115,000. The run of 12 aircraft was sold out within hours of the announcement and the first one was delivered on 31 May 2013.

In November 2013, the company announced that a follow-up batch of twelve RV-12s, again to be assembled by Synergy Air, would be sold fully equipped for US$123,000 or US$115,000 for the base model. Synergy Air indicated that they expect to produce about 50 aircraft per year on an ongoing basis.

In August 2018, Van's announced that they would move production of the SLSA RV-12 from Synergy to the Van's factory, with Synergy continuing as a builder assist center.

Operational history
An RV-12 was built by students of Emirates airline to enhance their knowledge and hands on technical experience, and is used to promote the airline training programmes. The airplane, painted in Emirates airline livery, is exhibited in the Emirates Engineering Centre at the Dubai International Airport and was displayed at the 2013 Dubai Airshow.

Specifications (RV-12)
Data from: Van's Aircraft website

See also

References

 Av Web Article about the RV-12
 Van's Aircraft RV-12 spec sheet and photo
 RV-12 First Flight announcement
 RV-12 aircraft information page accessed 17 April 2015

External links

Van's Aircraft

Homebuilt aircraft
2000s United States civil utility aircraft
Light-sport aircraft
RV-12
Low-wing aircraft
Single-engined tractor aircraft
Aircraft first flown in 2006